Moose Creek heads in Denali National Park and Preserve and is a tributary of the Bearpaw River in central Alaska. Wonder Lake drains into Moose Creek. Variant names include Hutenaal'eey No' and Hutenaal'eeyh No' Hutl'ot.

References

Rivers of Denali Borough, Alaska
Rivers of Alaska